Kenosee may refer to: 

 Kenosee Lake, a lake in Saskatchewan, Canada
 Little Kenosee Lake, a lake in Saskatchewan
Kenosee Lake, Saskatchewan, a village in Saskatchewan
 Kenosee Park, a park in Saskatchewan
 Kenosee Superslides, a water park in Moose Mountain Provincial Park, Saskatchewan